The Air Force Armament Museum is a military aviation museum adjacent to Eglin Air Force Base in Valparaiso, Florida, dedicated to the display of Air Force armament. It is supported by the private, non-profit Air Force Armament Museum Foundation.

History
The museum opened to the public on 22 June 1974 in a converted 1940s era chapel. Two years later, the Air Force Armament Museum Foundation was established with the goal of constructing a new building. The foundation faced significant public opposition in its early years driven by a referendum to appropriate county funding for the new building. After the referendum failed, the original building was condemned and the museum was forced to close in 1981.

A new  square foot building located outside the base's west gate was eventually funded entirely through private donations. The new museum building opened on 15 November 1985. Shortly thereafter, an exhibit on prisoners of war was inaugurated. Starting in 1990, a number of aircraft were received in quick succession, with an SR-71 arriving that year, a B-52 in 1991, and a MiG-21 in 1992. An exhibit about Air Force Special Operations Command was dedicated in 1996.

By 2007, the museum began raising funds for an educational annex. In 2019 and 2020, a P-51 and F-86 respectively were experimentally wrapped in vinyl. Following decades of planning, an African American Military Heritage Hall – the first of four Quonset hut styled structures – opened to the public in February 2022.

Exhibits
A wide variety of bombs, missiles, and rockets are exhibited, including the newest air-to-air missile, the AMRAAM, and the GBU-28 bunker-buster developed for use during Operation Desert Storm. Other missiles include the Paveway series, Falcons, the Tomahawk, Mace, Hound Dog, radar-controlled, laser-controlled and several guided by a TV camera in the nose.  Also on display is the GBU-43 MOAB, Massive Ordnance Air Blast bomb, or by its nickname, "Mother of All Bombs", the world's largest conventional explosive weapon. A predecessor, the T-12 Cloudmaker  earthquake bomb, is displayed outside, while a Fat Man casing is indoors. In addition, a BLU-82B was acquired in 2019.

A gun vault displays a variety of weapons ranging from a 1903 Springfield rifle to the GAU-8, which is capable of shooting 6,000 rounds per minute. Featured are the Sikes Antique Pistol Collection, with over 180 handguns, including flintlocks, duelling pistols, Western six-shooters, Civil War pistols, and a wide variety of early military weaponry.

Programs
The museum hosts the Engineers for America education program, which involves a school classroom tour of the museum with basic engineering experiments led by teachers and volunteers.

Collection

Aircraft on display

 Bell UH-1M Iroquois 66-15186
 Boeing B-17G Flying Fortress 44-83863
 Boeing B-52G Stratofortress 58-0185, "El Lobo II"
 Boeing RB-47H Stratojet 53-4296
 Cavalier F-51D Mustang 68-15796
 Cessna O-2A Skymaster 68-6864
 Douglas TC-47B Skytrain 44-76486
 Fairchild Republic A-10A Thunderbolt II 75-0288
 General Dynamics F-16A Fighting Falcon 80-0573
 General Dynamics F-111E Aardvark 68-0058
 Lockheed AC-130A Spectre 53-3129
 Lockheed F-80C Shooting Star 49-0432
 Lockheed F-104D Starfighter 57-1331
 Lockheed MQM-105 Aquila – mock-up
 Lockheed SR-71A Blackbird 61-7959
 Lockheed T-33A 53-5947
 Martin EB-57B Canberra 52-1516
 McDonnell F-4C Phantom II 64-0817
 McDonnell JF-101B Voodoo 56-0250
 McDonnell RF-4C Phantom II 67-0452
 McDonnell Douglas F-15A Eagle 74-0124
 Mikoyan-Gurevich MiG-21F-13 14
 North American F-86F Sabre 52-5513
 North American F-100C Super Sabre 54-1986
 North American TB-25J Mitchell 44-30854
 Northrop F-89D Scorpion 53-2610
 Republic F-84F Thunderjet 51-9495
 Republic F-105D Thunderchief 58-1155
 Republic P-47N Thunderbolt 44-89320
 Ryan BQM-34A Firebee
 Ryan BQM-34F Firebee 70-1410
 Sikorsky MH-53M Pave Low IV 73-1652

Missiles on display

 General Dynamics BGM-109A Tomahawk
 Martin CGM-13 Mace 59-4860
 North American AGM-28 Hound Dog 59-2794
 Republic-Ford JB-2 Loon – on loan from the National Air and Space Museum

References

Notes

Bibliography

 
 Museum News, "SPAD-13 and Air Force Armament Museum", Aerospace Historian, Air Force Historical Foundation, Manhattan, Kansas, Spring/March 1976, Vol. 23, no. 1, p. 50.

External links

Aerospace museums in Florida
Museum
Military and war museums in Florida
Museums in Okaloosa County, Florida
Museums established in 1975
1975 establishments in Florida